Ishmael is the first child of Abraham in Abrahamic religions.

Ishmael may also refer to:

People
 Ishmael son of Nethaniah, the murderer of Gedaliah, Nebuchadnezzar II's provincial governor
 Ishmael (Book of Mormon), a figure in the Book of Mormon
 Ishmael ben Elisha, more commonly "Rabbi Ishmael", 2nd-century rabbi
 Ishmael ben Jose, 3rd-century rabbi, the son of Jose ben Halafta
 Saint Isfael, a 6th-century Breton prince and Welsh saint also known as Ismael and Ishmael 
 Ishmael Beah (born 1980), Sierra Leonean author and former child soldier
 Ishmael Hyman (born 1995), American football player
 Ismail Kadare (born 1936), Albanian novelist and poet
 Ishmael Noko, General Secretary of the Lutheran World Federation since 1995
 Ishmael Reed (born 1938), American poet, essayist and novelist
Nola Ishmael (born 1943), Barbadian nurse

Fictional characters
 Ishmael (Moby-Dick), the narrator in the novel Moby-Dick by Herman Melville
 Ishmael, a "mad" character with apparent mystical powers in Ingmar Bergman's film Fanny and Alexander
 Ishmael, the wizard who imprisoned the goblins in Goblins in the Castle by Bruce Coville
 Ishmael, the main protagonist in The Haj, a 1984 novel by Leon Uris
 Ishmael (character), the name of two fictional characters in DC Comics

Literature
 Ishmael (Quinn novel), a 1992 philosophical novel by Daniel Quinn
 Ishmael (Southworth novel), an 1876 novel by E.D.E.N. Southworth
 Ishmael (Star Trek), a Star Trek novel by Barbara Hambly
 Ishmael, a chapbook by Peter Straub

Places
 Ismael, Sar-e Pol, a village in Afghanistan
 Ishmael, Missouri, a ghost town in the United States

See also
 St Ishmaels
 Ismael (disambiguation)
 Ismail (disambiguation)
 Ismaël
 Ishamael
 Isfael